Theatre Pasta is an Indian theatre magazine launched in 2005 and published by Chilsag Chillies Theatre Company, with playwright and director Sachin Gupta as its editor.

Since 2007 it has presented annually the Theatre Pasta Theatre Awards, in association with Chilsag International and the Actor's Experimental Laboratory, U.S.

History

Theatre Pasta was founded on 9 March 2005, by Sachin Gupta, playwright/theatre director and the founder-director of Chilsag Chillies Theatre Company.

See also
 Madeeha Gauhar

References

External links
 Official website
 Theatre Pasta Theatre Awards
 , interviewed by Supriya Vohra
 'Joy Michael', interviewed by Supriya Vohra
 'Sunit tandon', interviewed by Supriya Vohra
 'Chindodi Leela', interviewed by Nalina Mittra
 'Nadira Babbar', interviewed by Supriya Vohra

2005 establishments in Delhi
English-language magazines published in India
Visual arts magazines published in India
Monthly magazines published in India
Magazines established in 2005
Theatre in India
Theatre magazines
Magazines published in Delhi